Thomas Edward Cone (1947 – April 2012) was a Canadian-American playwright and librettist.

Cone's work often presented provocative ideas about morality and art and it stretches existing forms through the integration of music and the visual arts. In many of his plays, characters are "riding a fault line, about to make a change which may result in tragedy", sharing an "evocative, somewhat taboo recollection of their common past". In True Mummy two former lovers who once crossed a dangerous line together, are reunited. The title of the play refers to a black, luminous glaze used by artists such as J. M. W. Turner, that was made from the ash of cremated mummies. Visions of life and death of an Egyptian Princess form alternating scenes, and, as she is being prepared for mummification, towards the end of the play when a Turner painting is displayed, it becomes clear that she is on it.

Other plays include Herringbone, Stargazing and Love at Last Sight and Cone wrote librettos for operas The Architect (for Vancouver Opera, 1993), The Gang (Vancouver New Music, 1997), and Game Misconduct (Vancouver Playhouse 2000). He also wrote adaptations of Molière's The Miser and Goldoni's The Servant of Two Masters  which were performed at the Stratford Festival where he was a writer-in-residence between 1978 and 1980.

Cone adapted Herringbone into a musical in 1981, with music by Skip Kennon and lyrics by Ellen Fitzhugh. It premiered in Chicago followed by productions in New York at Playwrights Horizons, in London at The King's Head Theatre, at the Edinburgh Festival, at Hartford Stage starring Joel Grey, and in many cities throughout North America. From 2007 to 2009 it toured Williamstown Theater Festival, McCarter Theatre (Princeton, NJ) and the La Jolla Playhouse (CA) in a production  starring BD Wong, directed by Roger Rees.
Tom Cone lived in Vancouver where he was an active curator and promoter of experimental music and the avant-garde. He died in April 2012 of cancer.

Selected works 
 There (1972)
 The Organiser (1973)
 Cubistique (1974)
 Herringbone (1975) 
 Whisper To Mendelsohn (1975)
 The Imaginary Invalid (1975)
 Beautiful Tigers (1976)
 Shotglass (1977)
 Stargazing (1978)
 1792 (1978)
 The Writer's Show (1978)
 The Servant Of Two Masters (1980)
 The Architect (1993) 
 True Mummy (1997) 
 Donald and Lenore (2008)

References 

 Wallace, Robert and Zimmerman, Cynthia eds. The Work: Conversations with English-Canadian Playwrights. Toronto: Coach House, 1982.
 Klobucar, Andrew: Do Play with your Food: Tom Cone, True Mummy. Vancouver: Anvil Press, 2004. The Rain 2:4 (July–August 2004): 2. 
 Everybody on the Sidewalk: A Conversation with Tom Cone, TCR The Capilano Review 3.4/Winter 2008 Collaborations Issue, pp. 5–26
 La Jolla Playhouse Presents Herringbone With BD Wong 8/1-30 In Sheila & Hughes Potiker Theatre. Broadwayworld.com, 2009. 
 Saltzman, Simon: Herringbone. A CurtainUp New Jersey Review, 2008. 
 Gates, Anita: Seeking Fortune and Finding Fame. New York Times, September 21, 2008. 
 Richards, David: In a One-Man Show, Joel Grey Is a Crowd. New York Times, June 6, 1993. 
 Wada, Karen: B.D. Wong's pursuit of 'Herringbone'. Los Angeles Times, August 2, 2009. 
 Heatley, Stephen: Theatrical Rides. canlit.ca. Canadian Literature #187 (Winter 2005) Web. 31 Dec. 2011. 
 Ledingham, Jo: Playwright eulogizes U.S. over Mai Tais; Despite sense of adventure, Theatre Replacement gets lost in America. Vancouver Courier, March 11, 2010. http://www.vancourier.com/story_print.html?id=2674609&sponsor=

External links 
 In The Capilano Review, Winter 2008 / 3.4, The Collaborations Issue 
 Entry on the Canadian Theatre Encyclopedia 
 "Interview Herringbone Creators Tom Cone, Skip Kennon, and Ellen Fitzhugh" on mccarter.org 
 Short biography at Anvil Press 

1947 births
2012 deaths
American male stage actors
Canadian male stage actors
20th-century Canadian dramatists and playwrights
21st-century Canadian dramatists and playwrights
American opera librettists
Canadian librettists
20th-century American dramatists and playwrights
21st-century American dramatists and playwrights
American male dramatists and playwrights
Canadian male dramatists and playwrights
20th-century Canadian male writers
21st-century Canadian male writers
20th-century American male writers
21st-century American male writers